The Institute of Geographical Information Systems (IGIS) was established by the National University of Sciences and Technology, Pakistan (NUST) to focus on the educational needs of students in Geographical Information Systems (GIS) and Remote Sensing (RS). IGIS is presenting a number of programs starting from basic short courses and diploma courses to the degree level programs like MS and Ph.D. IGIS makes good use of its relationship with relevant government organizations to provides best level of education to its students.

Degrees
IGIS is a degree awarding institute which is currently offering the following programs:
 Bachelors in Geoinformatics Engineering
 MS Remote Sensing and Geographical Information Systems (RS & GIS)
 PhD in Remote Sensing and Geographical Information Systems (RS & GIS)

Student/Professional Exchange Program
The Institute of Geographical information system has signed an agreement with Asian Institute of Technology, Thailand to award dual degrees to master students based on the studies in both the institutes.
The proposed program envisages cooperation in RS & GIS with Civil and Infrastructure Engineering Department of School of Engineering and Technology (SET), AIT, Thailand and Institute of Geographical Information Systems (IGIS), School of Civil and Environmental Engineering (SCEE), NUST, Pakistan.

See also
NUST Institute of Civil Engineering
School of Civil and Environmental Engineering
Institute of Environmental Sciences and Engineering
National University of Sciences and Technology, Pakistan

References

External links
 IGIS official website
 NUST School of Civil and Environmental Engineering official website
 NUST official website

National University of Sciences & Technology
Universities and colleges in Rawalpindi District